The 2019 season was the Indianapolis Colts' 67th in the National Football League (NFL) and their 36th in Indianapolis. It was also their second season under head coach Frank Reich and third under the leadership of general manager Chris Ballard.

For the first time since 2011, quarterback Andrew Luck was not on the roster, as he announced his retirement on August 24, 2019. A four-time Pro Bowler and the top pick in the 2012 Draft, Luck led the Colts to four playoff appearances (2012–2014, 2018), an appearance in the AFC Championship Game in the 2014 season (the franchise's only time doing so in the post-Peyton Manning era), and won the NFL Comeback Player of the Year award in 2018. A four-year cycle of injuries and rehab that dated back to 2015 had "taken his joy of this game away," which led to his decision of retiring. This would also mark kicker Adam Vinatieri's last season in the NFL, after playing 24 years in the league, as he would spend the entire 2020 season in free agency before retiring on May 26, 2021. A four-time Super Bowl champion with the Colts and New England Patriots, Vinatieri is considered one of the greatest kickers of all time and made memorable game-winning plays with the Patriots in games such as the Tuck Rule Game and Super Bowls XXXVI and XXXVIII. Vinatieri was also the last remaining active player whose career began in the 1990s.

Despite a strong 5–2 start, the Colts would suffer a late-season collapse, losing 7 of their next 9 games, and were eliminated from playoff contention after a Week 15 loss to the New Orleans Saints. This was partially a result of injuries to key skill players such as QB Jacoby Brissett, WR T. Y. Hilton, RB Marlon Mack and TE Eric Ebron. They also failed to improve or match their 10–6 record from the previous season.

Despite the disappointing season, the Colts managed to defeat the eventual Super Bowl champions the Kansas City Chiefs and limit the Chiefs offense to only 13 points, which at the time was the least points allowed to the Chiefs since Patrick Mahomes became the starter.

Draft

Notes
As the result of a negative differential of free agent signings and departures that the Colts experienced during the  free agency period, the team was awarded one compensatory selection for the 2019 draft.
The Colts acquired the Raiders' fourth-round pick (109th) in exchange for their two fourth-round picks (129th and 135th)

Staff

Final roster

Preseason

The team was rocked by the decision August 24 by starting quarterback Andrew Luck that he would immediately retire from professional football due to chronic injury problems and the emotional and mental strain they had extracted. Luck, the 2018 NFL Comeback Player of the Year, had been battling a mysterious and slow-healing leg injury, described by the team variously as a "calf strain" and a "high ankle issue."

Luck, a 7-year professional with four appearances in the NFL Pro Bowl, indicated that he had been contemplating leaving the game for a week-and-a-half or two weeks prior to his announcement; he had been speaking with team officials about the matter all week. In a news conference Luck indicated that his recurring injuries had "taken my joy of this game away.... After 2016, I played in pain and was unable to practice, I said I wouldn't go through that again."

The team moved forward with former New England Patriots backup Jacoby Brissett, a third-year Colt, as its designated starting quarterback.

Regular season

Schedule

Note: Intra-division opponents are in bold text.

Game summaries

Week 1: at Los Angeles Chargers

Week 2: at Tennessee Titans

Week 3: vs. Atlanta Falcons

Week 4: vs. Oakland Raiders

Week 5: at Kansas City Chiefs

Week 7: vs. Houston Texans

Week 8: vs. Denver Broncos

Week 9: at Pittsburgh Steelers

Adam Vinatieri missed a potential game-winning field goal late in the fourth quarter, resulting in a narrow two-point loss.

Week 10: vs. Miami Dolphins

Week 11: vs. Jacksonville Jaguars
The Colts would defeat the Jacksonville Jaguars for the team's 300th win in the Indianapolis era with a record of 300–267.

Week 12: at Houston Texans

Week 13: vs. Tennessee Titans

Week 14: at Tampa Bay Buccaneers

Week 15: at New Orleans Saints

The loss eliminated the Colts from postseason contention.

Week 16: vs. Carolina Panthers

Week 17: at Jacksonville Jaguars

Standings

Division

Conference

References

External links

Behind the Colts (video series), Indianapolis Colts.  "With The Next Pick," (May 7, 2019) | "2019 Training Camp: Part 1," (July 27, 2019) | "2019 Training Camp: Part 2," (Aug. 8, 2019) | Training Camp: Part 3," (Aug. 22, 2019) | No Excuses (Luck retires) (Aug. 30, 2019) |

Indianapolis
Indianapolis Colts seasons
Indianapolis Colts